The Seram bush warbler (Locustella musculus) is a species of Old World warbler in the family Locustellidae. It is endemic to the island Seram in Indonesia where it is found on the forest floor.

References

 

Seram bush warbler
Birds of Seram
Seram bush warbler
Seram bush warbler